What the heck may refer to:

What the Heck?, 1986 board game
What the Heck Fest, a festival held in Anacortes, Washington
"What the Heck I Gotta Do", song in the musical 21 Chump Street

See also
What the (disambiguation)
What the Hell (disambiguation)